{{Infobox language
|name=Vere (Gwèri)
|nativename=Momi and mom Jango|region=northern Nigeria and Cameroon
|speakers=110,000 
|date=2000
|ref=e18
|familycolor=Niger-Congo
|fam2=Atlantic–Congo
|fam3=Leko–Nimbari
|fam4=Duru
|fam5=Vere–Dowayo
|dia1=Mom Jango
|dia2=Momi
|iso3=ver
|glotto=momj1237
|glottoname=Mom Jango
|glotto2=nort3260
|glottoname2=Northern Alantika
|glottorefname2=Northern Alantika Vere
|glotto3=vere1252
|glottoname3=Vere Kaadam (Momi)
|glottorefname3=Vere Kaadam
}}

The Gwèri or Vere language Were also known as Kobo or Mom Jango, is a member of the Duru branch of Savanna languages. It is spoken across the northern Nigerian–Cameroonian border.

Names
Vere is a cultural and geographical cover term that may include several completely distinct language varieties.

The Kobo (in three villages north of the Chamba Leko area) are the only group of people known as Vere in Cameroon. Kobo is spoken in Béka commune, Faro department, North Region.

Raymond Boyd had collected data from an ethnic Samba informant in Tignère speaking a language called Mome or Nya Kopo "language of the mountain", which he had learned from his mother. The lexicon is very different from "Kobo" as documented by ALCAM (2012), although both are clearly Adamawa languages. In this language, 'man' is called vere. However, according to Boyd, Mome or Nya Kopo is a Mumuye dialect. There are approximately 4,000 Kobo speakers in Cameroon. It is also spoken in Nigeria.

Dialects
Dialects are Mom Jango and Momi (also known as Ziri''). These are divergent enough they probably constitute distinct languages.
Kleinewillinghöfer (2012) distinguishes three Vere languages:
Mom Jango
Northern Alantika Vere
Vere Kaadam (Momi)

Distribution
Jango is spoken in the villages of Mayo Ini, Nassarwo Koma, Jumɓaare, Mantunaa, Soncha (Choncha), Bambu, DanWumba, Tɛkɛrɛ, Korkai, Gawì, Zaari, Gerta, Kaau Pindu, Garau, Giwaare, Jagu suwa, Vam guiti, Gogura, Tondiire, and Layinde.

References

Duru languages
Languages of Nigeria
Languages of Cameroon